Gilles Loiselle,  (20 May 1929 – 29 September 2022) was a Canadian politician.

Loiselle was born in Ville-Marie, Quebec on 20 May 1929. He worked as the correspondent for CBC News in Paris for a decade before being appointed the government of Quebec's agent-general in the United Kingdom in 1977. He represented Quebec to the British government when the federal government of Canada was negotiating the Patriation of the Constitution of Canada from Britain in the 1980s.

After being elected to the House of Commons of Canada in the 1988 federal election, Loiselle joined the cabinet of Brian Mulroney.  In 1990, he was elevated to the post of President of the Treasury Board and, in 1993, he served as Minister of Finance in the short-lived government of Kim Campbell.

Loiselle, a Progressive Conservative, was defeated in the 1993 election. The Tories were cut down to two seats, and Loiselle himself was held to third place.

He was named to the National Order of Quebec in 2011.

He died in Montreal on 29 September 2022, aged 93.

Electoral record

References

External links 
 

1929 births
2022 deaths
Canadian Ministers of Finance
Progressive Conservative Party of Canada MPs
Members of the 24th Canadian Ministry
Members of the 25th Canadian Ministry
Members of the House of Commons of Canada from Quebec
Members of the King's Privy Council for Canada
People from Abitibi-Témiscamingue
French Quebecers